Aliabad-e Nokhowd Darreh (also Romanized as‘Alīābād-e Nokhowd Darreh; also known as ‘Alīābād) is a village in Karaftu Rural District, in the Central District of Takab County, West Azerbaijan Province, Iran. At the 2006 census, its population was 182, in 31 families.

References 

Populated places in Takab County